Animafilm is a Romanian animation studio, located in central Bucharest.

The studio was created in 1964 from the animation division of Studioul Cinematografic București (Bucharest Cinematographic Studios). Ion Popescu-Gopo was the best-known graphic artist and animator working at Animafilm.

Initially a state-owned studio, after the fall of the communist regime in 1989, Animafilm became a private company, as Animafilm S.A. The current director is Monica Hodor. In 2004, the company made a profit of 248 million lei, on revenue of 1.1 billion lei.

References

External links
 
  "Tristeţea omuleţului lui Gopo", Săptămâna financiară, June 20, 2005

1964 establishments in Romania
Romanian animation studios
Mass media companies established in 1964 
Companies based in Bucharest